Esme & Roy is an animated children's television series created by Dustin Ferrer and Amy Steinberg. The series is produced by Canada-based animation studio Nelvana and Sesame Street creator Sesame Workshop, in association with Corus Entertainment.

The series focuses a young girl named Esme and her best friend, a monster named Roy, who care for all kinds of creatures when their regular guardians need aid. Esme and Roy was broadcast simultaneously on HBO in the United States and Treehouse TV in Canada on August 18, 2018.

On May 6, 2019, it was announced that the series was renewed for a second season. and would also air as part of the Family Night block on PBS Kids' 24/7 channel in the summer. In September 2019, it was announced new episodes of the show would be moving from HBO to HBO Max, starting with the second season. The second season premiered on June 25, 2020. A holiday-themed episode was released on December 10, 2020. The second season premiered on PBS Kids on Saturday, March 6, 2021.

The show was removed from HBO Max in August 2022.

Plot 
Esme & Roy follows a young girl named Esme and her best monster friend, Roy, the most in-demand "monster sitters" in Monsterdale, a town populated mostly by colorful monsters. The duo set out to solve big problems by playing and helping out the young monsters with their problems.

Episodes

Characters

Main 
 Esmeralda "Esme" (voiced by Millie Davis) is a 9-year-old African-American girl and a monster sitter, and she has a skill for inventing activities to fix the monsters' problems, with the help of the MonsterCase, a suitcase full of fun and games that encourages the monsters to play their problems away and turns into a motorized scooter when taking Esme and Roy to where their monstersitting service is needed.  Esme only went through a Monster Sitter Meltdown in "Party Time", but like what she does for the little monsters she and Roy watch, Roy helps her feel better by singing the "Belly Breathing" song, which is normally sung by Esme. In "Stroller Derby", it's revealed that Esme goes to a school that's different from the one the little monsters go to.
 Roy (voiced by Patrick McKenna) is Esme's best friend and a yellow monster. He is a lovable silly monster who knows everything about monsters with his Monster Fact book. He loves to eat meatballs. Roy went through a Monster Sitter Meltdown in 3 episodes which they are: "Two Can Play That Game", "Sing Out, Roy", & "Training Day", but Esme, along with the little monsters, helped him feel better by singing the "Belly Breathing" song, which is normally sung by Esme doing it solo. But, Esme did help him feel better by singing the "Belly Breathing" song solo in two episodes only.
 Dumpling is Esme and Roy's pet monster. She can roll herself up into a ball and loves to dance.
 Hugo Ooga (voiced by Shayle Simons) is a theatrical 4-year-old winged monster. He loves to be the star of the show and creates his own spotlight by clapping his hands.
 Fig Ooga (voiced by Elle Simon) is Hugo's 1-year-old baby sister. Unlike her brother, she has no wings. While small, she has super strength and loves to pick up Roy to demonstrate it. She shrinks if she smells a Sludgeflower.
 Tillie Plink (voiced by Abigail Oliver) is an active 3-year-old  monster with pink fur, blue eyes, and red hair tied into pigtails with a pair of blue hairbows. She has a need for speed and loves cars and playing rough-and-tumble games and she spins a lot really fast like a dervish when she's sad, for fun, or for dancing. Sometimes, she refers to herself in third-person, much like Elmo from Sesame Street.
 Snugs Muzzywump (voiced by Benjamin Hum) is an adorable 3-year-old monster who loves to hug and snuggle with people and monsters alike. He puffs up when he gets scared, but is easily calmable. He is frightened by thunder.
 Simon Swoozle (voiced by Jacob Soley) is a 8-year-old six-tentacled green monster with yellow hair, brown eyes and blue glasses. He loves enforcing routine and order. He has a big heart, is very artistic and he is very smart.
 Sid Hoozlewoo & Lucy Hoozlewoo (voiced by Christian Corrao & Hattie Kragten) appear in "Imitation Frustration", "Don't Bug Me", & "Warm and Fuzzy Day". They can change colors, copy what they do and bounce around on their springy tails.
 Frank Bleederblop (voiced by Justin Paul Kelly) & Franny Bleedeerblop (voiced by Lilly Bartlam) appear in "Two Can Play That Game". They are twin dragon-like monsters.
 Mom and Dad: Esme's parents are, so far, only glimpsed during the opening theme of the show. They live in the house next to the garage where Esme and Roy usually hang out when they're not on their monstersitting duties and are shown waving goodbye to Esme and Roy as they set off to where they're needed. Aside from Esme, they appear to be the only human residents of Monsterdale.

Recurring 
 Mr. Plink (voiced by Zachary Bennett) is Tillie's father.
 Grammy Swoozle (voiced by Jayne Eastwood) is Simon's grandmother
 Willie (voiced by Richard Binsley) is Simon and Grammy Swoozle's pet.
 Mrs. Muzzywump (voiced by Denise Oliver) is Snugs' mother.
 Mr. Bleederblop (voiced by Jamie Watson) is the father of Frank and Franny.
 Mr. Ooga (voiced by Martin Roach) is Hugo and Fig's father.
 Mrs. Ooga (voiced by Melissa Altro is Hugo and Fig's mother.
 Mrs. Hoozlewoo (voiced by Kylee Evans) is Sid and Lucy's mother.
 Lottie (voiced by Lilly Bartlam) is introduced in "Monster's Little Helper". She wants to learn to be a Monster Sitter from Esme and Roy. She has yellow fur and flies with wings. She returns and makes a minor part in "Game Plan" to help monsters prepare for Camp Monsterdale.
 Norm (voiced by Patrick McKenna) appears in "Supermarket Match". He is a blue monster with tentacles, blue hair, and green eyes and speaks like a teenager.  He appears to be a monster of all trades, as he has a different job in every episode.

Production 
Nelvana ordered 52 11-minute segments, equal to 26 half-hours, of each season of Esme & Roy, for 104 11-minute segments (two of which comprise the 22-minute special episode) in total.

Broadcast 
Esme & Roy premiered on Treehouse TV in Canada and HBO on August 18, 2018, and PBS Kids on August 31, 2019 to June 27, 2021, in the United States. The show began international broadcast following its U.S. and Canadian premieres.
The show began airing on the Cartoonito preschool block on Cartoon Network and HBO Max on September 18, 2021 in the United States. Esme and Roy was premiered on Disney Junior Asia from August 12, 2019 until April 2021 before being moved to Cartoon Network Asia in 2022 as part of the Cartoonito block.

Reception

Critical 
Esme & Roy has been met with mostly positive reception. Emily Ashby of Common Sense Media rated Esme & Roy a total of 5 out of 5 stars, stating that Esme & Roy's "thoughtful approach to self-awareness and mindful behavior makes it an excellent tool for families and caretakers to use in teaching similar skills to kids," and that the broader emotions will relate to a child's experiences.

Awards and nominations

References

External links 

 at Sesame Workshop
 
 

2010s American animated television series
2020s American animated television series
2010s American black cartoons
2020s American black cartoons
2010s American children's comedy television series
2020s American children's comedy television series
2010s Canadian animated television series
2020s Canadian animated television series
2010s Canadian black cartoons
2020s Canadian black cartoons
2010s Canadian children's television series
2020s Canadian children's television series
2018 American television series debuts
2021 American television series endings
2018 Canadian television series debuts
2021 Canadian television series endings
2010s preschool education television series
2020s preschool education television series
American children's animated adventure television series
American children's animated comedy television series
American children's animated fantasy television series
American children's animated musical television series
American preschool education television series
Animated duos
Animated television series about children
Canadian children's animated adventure television series
Canadian children's animated comedy television series
Canadian children's animated fantasy television series
Canadian children's animated musical television series
Cartoon Network original programming
Cartoonito original programming
Canadian preschool education television series
Animated preschool education television series
English-language television shows
Fictional duos
HBO original programming
HBO Max original programming
PBS Kids shows
PBS original programming
Television series by Corus Entertainment
Television series by Sesame Workshop
Television series by Nelvana
Animated television series about monsters
Treehouse TV original programming